Khwaja Du Koh is a district of Jowzjan province, Afghanistan, situated in the Karakum Desert. It borders Faryab province to the west, Khamyab District to the north, Mingajik District to the east and Sheberghan District to the south. The population is 23,900 (2006). The district capital is Khwaja du koh, and is located in the southern part of the district.

See also 
 Khwaja du koh
 Jowzjan Province

References 
 AIMS District Map

Districts of Jowzjan Province